The Wire is an American crime drama television series created by David Simon and broadcast by the cable network HBO. It premiered on June 2, 2002, and ended on March 9, 2008, comprising sixty episodes over five seasons. Set in Baltimore, Maryland, The Wire follows different institutions within the city, such as the illegal drug trade, the education system, and the media, and their relationships to law enforcement. The series features a diverse ensemble cast of both veteran and novice actors; the large number of black actors was considered groundbreaking for the time.

The Wire has been widely hailed as one of the greatest television series of all time. Despite the critical acclaim, however, the show received relatively few awards during its run. It was nominated for only two Primetime Emmy Awards – both for Outstanding Writing for a Drama Series – and did not win any. Many have called its lack of recognition, especially in the Outstanding Drama Series category, one of the biggest Emmys snubs ever. Some have argued the lack of recognition was due to the show's dense plots and a disconnect between the setting and Los Angeles-based voters.

Outside of the Emmys, The Wire won a Writers Guild of America Award for Television: Dramatic Series in 2008, as well as a Directors Guild of America Award for the episode "Transitions" in 2009. It was thrice named one of the top television programs of the year by the American Film Institute and received a Peabody Award in 2004. The series was nominated for sixteen NAACP Image Awards but never won one. It was also nominated for ten Television Critics Association Awards, with its only win coming in 2008 for the group's Heritage Award.

Awards and nominations

Notes

Nominees for awards

Other

References

External links
 

Awards and nominations
Wire